Synergy is Champ Lui Pio's debut album.

Track listing and durations

References

2010 albums